Capillipedium spicigerum, commonly known as scented-top grass, is a species of perennial grass in the family Poaceae that is native to Australia.

Description
Capillipedium spicigerum is a tufted perennial bunchgrass, without stolons or rhizomes.

The lower leaf sheaths of the plant are silky hairy.

The flowers emit a scent when crushed. The racemes have 3 to 8 pairs of spikelets, one stalked the other unstalked. Flowering is late spring to autumn.

Taxonomy
Capillipedium spicigerum was described by S.T. Blake in 1944.

Habitat and ecology

Capillipedium spicigerum is found on lower fertility soils of roadsides, native pastures and woodlands of Queensland, New South Wales, and the Northern Territory. C. spicigerum is very drought tolerant and readily grazed.

References

Bunchgrasses of Australasia
Endemic flora of Australia
Poales of Australia
Plants described in 1944
Andropogoneae